Suh Se-ok (hanja: 徐世鈺; 1929 – 29 November 2020) was a South Korean oriental painting artist.

Career
He was born in Daegu, Korea. Following his graduation from the College of Arts of the Seoul National University, he became an artist pursuing modernistic and independent formative world by wonderful illustration of the strengths of the colorless pale Indian ink and the empty and marginal spaces of oriental ink-and-wash paint in the lyrical abstract realm of the oriental paintings. An accomplished calligraphist, Suh began incorporating calligraphy techniques into his paintings in the 1950s.

His representative works include Seolhwayijang and People handling the sun. The figurative or abstract human forms in his paintings are made up of his characteristic brushstrokes of varying thickness, tones and lengths, painted in ink on mulberry paper.

He received wide range of art awards in Korea and participated in numerous overseas exhibitions including the 7th São Paulo Biennale in 1963, the exhibition of Korean Arts in Malaysia in 1966, The 1st Modern Painting Biennale in Italy in 1969, Exhibition of Korean Arts in France in 1967 and the 1st Cannes Painting Festival in 1969. He also participated in the regular general assembly of the IAA held in Tokyo, Japan in 1966 as the representative of Korea and travelled widely throughout the arts circle of the North America and Europe.

Meanwhile, his son, Do-ho Suh is also a representative modern artist of South Korea and is currently active in the world stage with permanent residence in London.

Awards
The Prime Minister Prize at the 1st National Art Exhibition, Korea (1949)
Ilmin Art Prize, Seoul, Korea (1994)
The Artistic and Culture Prize of 13th Federation of Artistic and Culture, Korea (1999)
52nd National Academy of Arts Award, Korea (2007)

See also
 Do-ho Suh

References

External links
 Naver Cast Suh Se-ok "선을 통한 인간 표현"
 Korea Encyclopædia Britannica 서세옥

South Korean painters
Seoul National University alumni
1929 births
2020 deaths